Apartadó is a town and municipality in the Antioquia Department, Colombia.

"Apartadó" means "river of plantains" in the local Indian language. The town is located near the Atlantic Ocean in the Gulf of Urabá, the economy is based in bananas, plantain, corn, cassava, cocoa, wood and livestock.

Apartadó is divided in 48 neighborhoods, and here is the best high school of the region of Urabá Antioquia. Today, the government is stimulating industrialization because it is near the Caribbean Sea and to the center of the country.
The municipality had a population of 127,744 in 2020.

Climate
Apartadó has a tropical rainforest climate (Köppen Af) with heavy rainfall year-round.

Transportation
The city is served by Antonio Roldán Betancourt Airport, with service on three commercial airlines.

References

Municipalities of Antioquia Department